Bad Neualbenreuth (before September 2019: Neualbenreuth) is a municipality in the district of Tirschenreuth in Bavaria, Germany.

References

Tirschenreuth (district)
Czech Republic–Germany border crossings